Horaiclavus julieae is a species of sea snail, a marine gastropoda mollusk in the family Horaiclavidae.

Description
The length of the sherll attains 18.8 mm.

Distribution
This marine species occurs off the Philippines

Original description
 Stahlschmidt P., Poppe G.T. & Tagaro S.P. (2018). Descriptions of remarkable new turrid species from the Philippines. Visaya. 5(1): 5-64. page(s): 30, pl. 23 figs 1-3.

References

External links

 Worms Link

julieae